William Petersen (August 3, 1912 – June 10, 2004) was an American sociologist and demographer.

Life
Petersen was born in Jersey City, New Jersey on August 3, 1912. He gained a PhD from Columbia University in 1954. He taught in the Sociology Department at the University of California at Berkeley from 1953 to 1956 and 1959 to 1966. During his time there, he became influential in the use and perpetuation of the term "model minority," typecasting East Asian Americans (specifically Japanese Americans) as "successful." He attributed this "success" to Japanese Americans' obedience and their ability to overcome the "self-defeating apathy or self-hatred" that other racial minorities, specifically Black Americans, that cause them to "react negatively" to new opportunities and equal opportunities. From 1966 to 1967, Petersen was professor of sociology at Boston College, and from 1967 to 1978 he was the Robert Lazarus Professor of Social Demography at Ohio State University. He co-authored Dictionary of Demography: Biographies with his wife, Rene, in 1985.

Petersen died on June 10, 2004, at the age of 91.

Works
 Planned Migration: The Social Determinants of the Dutch-Canadian Movement, 1955.
 (ed.) American Social Patterns: Studies of Race Relations, Popular Heroes, Voting, Union Democracy and Government Bureaucracy, 1956
 Population, 1961. Second edition, 1969. Third edition, 1975.
 (ed.) The realities of world communism, 1963
 (ed. with David Matza) Social controversy, 1963
 The Politics of Population, 1964
 'Success Story: Japanese-American Style', New York Times Magazine, 9 January 1966, pp.20ff
 'Migration: Social Aspects', International Encyclopedia of the Social Sciences, New York: Macmillan & The Free Press, 1968, Vol. 10, pp.286-292
 Japanese Americans: Oppression and Success, 1971
 (ed.) Readings in Population, 1972
 Malthus, 1979
 (with Rene Peterson) Dictionary of Demography: Biographies, 1985
 'Politics and the Measurement of Ethnicity', in William Alonso & Paul Starr, eds., The Politics of Numbers, New York: Russell Sage Foundation, 1986
 Ethnicity counts, 1997
 From Persons to People: Further Studies in the Politics of Population, 2003
 Against the Stream: Reflections of an Unconventional Demographer, 2004

References

1912 births
2004 deaths
American demographers
American sociologists
Ohio State University faculty
Columbia Graduate School of Arts and Sciences alumni
University of California, Berkeley faculty